The 1963 New York Jets season was the fourth season for the team in the American Football League (AFL) and the first under the moniker Jets, which followed a change in ownership. The season began with the team trying to improve on their 5–9 record from 1962 under new head coach Weeb Ewbank.  Playing their final season at the Polo Grounds in Upper Manhattan, the Jets finished at 5–8–1 in 1963; they relocated to Shea Stadium in the borough of Queens the following season.

In rebranding itself as the Jets, the club abandoned its navy-blue and gold uniforms in favor of kelly green and white. The jerseys had opposite-colored sleeves with thick stripes on the shoulders and cuffs, above and below the TV numerals. The pants were white with two parallel green stripes on each side. The new helmets were white with a single green stripe down the center; the logo on each side was a silhouette of a jet airplane in green, with the word "JETS" in thick white sans-serif italics along the fuselage.

Ewbank had led the NFL's Baltimore Colts for nine seasons (1954–62), including consecutive league titles in 1958 and 1959. Fired in January 1963, he was hired by the Jets in mid-April.

Roster

Schedule

Standings

References

External links
1963 team stats

New York Jets seasons
New York Jets
New York Jets
1960s in Manhattan
Washington Heights, Manhattan